Fulton is a census-designated place located in southern Howard County, Maryland, United States. As of the 2010 census it had a population of 2,049.

History
Indigenous peoples, likely Piscataway, used the land now known as Fulton for hunting and farming. The land's first European survey was by Thomas Browne, known as the "Patuxent Ranger", in 1700. In the mid-1700s Richard Snowden, the Quaker grandson of one of Maryland's first iron ore producers, purchased tracts of land up the Patuxent River valley. Fulton was then known as Queen Caroline Parish. In 1803 Rezin Hammond settled on a parcel of the land, and by 1805 Fulton was known as Hammond Directions and Snowden Second Addition. In 1855 German immigrants settled in the area.

By 1871, St Paul's Lutheran was founded to serve the German farming community and was expanded in 1933. By 1878 Fulton opened school house #3, a one-room school house for white children a half mile west of town that operated until 1939. The area was referred to as "Water's Store", for Richard Waters' blacksmith operation and post office which opened on December 29, 1874.

The name was changed to "Fulton", after the popular Baltimore Sun editor Charles C. Fulton on 28 March 1882. Albert W. Bradey purchased the Fulton corner stores of his father and Smallwood, operating it until his death in a house fire at the age of 90.

In 1839, Heinrich Iager purchased  of farmland expanding to s forming Maple Lawn Farms. In 1938, the farm began its current free-range turkey operations under the "Sho-Nuf" brand name. The farm was nationally recognized in 2004 for the registered Holsteins used in its dairy operations. The Ellsworth Iager farm took advantage of cheap POW labor through 1945.

In the late 1990s, Fulton sat between the heavily developed areas of eastern Howard County, with water and sewer service, and the preserved western areas which used well water. Developer Greenebaum & Rose Associates proposed a dense 1,168-unit mixed use project for a portion of the  farm. In January 1998, Councilman Darrell Drown felt that the zoning would take only a night or two, and accommodated the developer with expedited hearings. The first phase of zoning faced multiple contentious votes and 32 record-length hearings between pro-development and rural supporters.

In 2013, the Howard County Department of Planning and Zoning sought to expand water and sewer service so that the remaining Maple Lawn property could be developed at maximum density. A 7,000-person referendum attempt was launched and suppressed by the landowners' attorney, William Erskine, who sits on the economic development agency as well as the same law firm as County Executive Ken Ulman's father.

Historic local places of worship include Grace Community Church, St. Francis of Assisi Catholic Church, and St. Paul's Lutheran Church, which was built in the 1870s by a group of mostly German families after originally meeting in each other's homes since the 1860s.

Geography
Fulton is located in southern Howard County, bordered on the south by the Patuxent River and on the east by U.S. Route 29. The community of Scaggsville is to the east across US 29, and the Montgomery County community of Burtonsville is to the south across the Patuxent. Maryland Route 216 (Scaggsville Road) is the main east–west road through Fulton, which passes through nearby North Laurel and then the city of Laurel in Prince George's County.

Demographics

2010 Census
As of the 2010 Census, there are 2,049 people living in Fulton, of whom 70.96% are White, 14.84% Asian, 9.03% African American, 0.29% Native American, 0.54% other races, and 4.34% who consider themselves two or more races. Hispanic or Latino of any race made up 2.54% of Fulton's population. Of the population, 27.48% is under the age 18, 61.44% are 18–64, and 11.08% are above the age of 65. From 2008 to 2012 Fulton's median household income was $182,039 and median house value was $682,600.

Fulton today

The community is served by area codes 240, 301, 410, 443, and 667, and by ZIP codes 20759 and 20723.

Reservoir High School, Lime Kiln Middle School, Fulton Elementary School and Cedar Lane School are all located in Fulton.

Located in Fulton are a post office, High's Store, Ledo Pizza, a Pupusaria and several gas stations. Other retail establishments include Fulton Family Chiropractic, Cleaners, Fulton Station Jewelers, Fulton Animal Hospital, Fulton Wine & Spirits (liquor), Hilities Beauty, Nail Boutique at Fulton Station, Computer Country, Evergreen Stables, and the Studio at Fulton.

Adjacent to the northeast border of Fulton is the Johns Hopkins University Applied Physics Laboratory.

Maple Lawn, a mixed residential and commercial community which started in 2004/2005, was developed by Greenebaum & Rose Associates and has brought a "Main Street"-style shopping district, with stores such as Harris Teeter, Hyatt & Co. Clothing, Sidamo Coffee & Tea, i.m. Wine, Tutti Frutti Frozen Yogurt, Ranazul Tapas Wine & Bistro, Venegas Prime Filet, The Pearl Spa & Boutique, Looney's Pub, Pet Barn, Bra-La-La, BP Maple Lawn Market, AAA, CVS Pharmacy, Lax World, PNC Bank, and Techlab Photo & Digital (formerly of Dobbin Center). Four large office buildings house a number of corporate tenants. Additional businesses are located in the residential section of Maple Lawn: Offit Kurman, Maryland Homebuilders Association, SunTrust Bank, Homewood Suites hotel, Columbia Academy Pre-School, urgent care with a multi-provider Medical Centre.

Beaufort Park, one of the local neighborhoods, was described by The Washington Post on July 4, 1998, as 'A Sea of Tranquility Set in a Watershed, A Parklike Setting in Howard County'.

Notable people
Angela Brodie, biochemist who spent about half of her life in Fulton
Greg Hawkes, keyboardist for The Cars

See also
Snell's Bridge
Waters-Fulton Store and Post Office

References

Census-designated places in Howard County, Maryland
Census-designated places in Maryland